André de Paulo Barreto (born 6 August 1979 in Rio de Janeiro) is a Brazilian professional footballer who plays as a defensive midfielder.

Football career
Barreto's career began in Brazil with lowly Bangu Atlético Clube and Bonsucesso Futebol Clube. In July 2002, he moved to Portuguese Primeira Liga club Boavista F.C. from the former, but spent the 2002–03 season with C.D. Aves in the second division. In the same predicament, he played the following campaign with G.D. Estoril Praia.

In 2005, Barreto was bought by Polish league side Wisła Kraków, but was loaned in January of the following year to another Portuguese team, C.F. Estrela da Amadora. In the following two seasons, he played in the same country and in the same predicament, successively representing C.S. Marítimo, Vitória de Setúbal and C.D. Trofense. With the latter, he started in all the games he appeared in as the northerners promoted to the top flight for the first time in its history.

In 2008–09 Barreto returned to Wisła, but failed to make any appearances for the eventual league champions. Released, he signed with former side Bangu, moving to Associação Atlética Portuguesa (RJ) shortly after, on loan.

References

External links

1979 births
Living people
Footballers from Rio de Janeiro (city)
Brazilian footballers
Association football midfielders
Bangu Atlético Clube players
Bonsucesso Futebol Clube players
Associação Atlética Portuguesa (RJ) players
Primeira Liga players
Liga Portugal 2 players
C.D. Aves players
G.D. Estoril Praia players
Boavista F.C. players
C.F. Estrela da Amadora players
C.S. Marítimo players
Vitória F.C. players
C.D. Trofense players
Ekstraklasa players
Wisła Kraków players
Brazilian expatriate footballers
Expatriate footballers in Portugal
Expatriate footballers in Poland
Brazilian expatriate sportspeople in Portugal
Brazilian expatriate sportspeople in Poland